Jean-Baptiste de Laubier (born 2 April 1979), known professionally as Para One, is a French electronic music producer and film director.

Music career
Laubier first came to prominence as one of the main producers of French rap group TTC, and was responsible for producing their 2004 signature tune Dans Le Club. With fellow TTC producer Tacteel he made up the now defunct live/improvised electro outfit Fuck-A-Loop (whose only recorded material prior to 2007's nine-hour digital album The Early Aughties was a 2006 remix of Ellen Allien's Down). In 2006, he remixed The Prime Time of Your Life by French house duo Daft Punk. In 2008, Laubier's remix of Ayumi Hamasaki's Greatful Days was released on the album Ayu-mi-x 6: Gold.

Laubier has produced original music for the director Celine Sciamma's films Water Lilies (2007), Tomboy (2011), Girlhood (2014), and Portrait of a Lady on Fire (2019). Tomboy featured the song "Always" from Para One and Tacteel's Fair Enough EP.

Film career
Apart from his musical career, Laubier has also worked as a film director. In 2009, he directed the short movie It Was On Earth That I Knew Joy for French brand Sixpack France.
The movie was presented on February 20, 2010 at SCION Installation, Los Angeles.

Discography

Albums
 Epiphanie (2006)
 Passion (2012)
 Club (2014)
 Spectre - Machines of Loving Grace (2021)

Soundtracks
 Naissance des Pieuvres (2007), soundtrack for the movie Water Lilies, directed by Céline Sciamma
 Girlhood, la bande originale de Bande de Filles (2014), soundtrack for the movie Girlhood, directed by Céline Sciamma
 Portrait of a Lady on Fire (2019), soundtrack for the movie directed by Céline Sciamma

Singles

 Para One – Beat Down EP (2003)
 Paraone / Iris / Sept / Flynt / Lyricson (2003)
 Para One – Clubhoppn EP (2005)
 Para One – Dundun-Dun single (2006)
 Para One – Dundun-Dun - Remixes  (2006)
 Para One – Epiphanie (2006)
 Para One – Midnight Swim (2007)
 Para One – Water Lilies (film) OST (2007)
 Para One – Kiwi / Toadstool (2010)
 Para One – Animal Style / Nevrosis (2010)
 Das Glow & Para One – Pulsar / Freeze (2011)
 Para One & Tacteel – Fair Enough EP (2011)
 Para One & San Serac pres. Slice & Soda – Year of the Dragon (2011)
 Para One & Teki Latex – 5th Dimension (2011)
 Para One – Passion (2012)
 Para One – You Too (2014)

Filmography 
 Les Premières Communions (2004), short movie
 Cache Ta Joie (2005), short movie
 It Was On Earth That I Knew Joy (2009), short movie

Remixes
 2003 : Animal Machine - Persona
 2003 : Agoria - Spinach Girl
 2004 : Krazy Baldhead - Revolution
 2005 : Stacs Of Stamina - Mistake, Rewind, Repeat
 2005 : Billy Crawford - 3 Wishes (Remix paru en 2011, non trouvable dans le commerce)
 2006 : Ellen Allien - Down (Fuckaloop remix)
 2006 : Bloc Party - The Prayer
 2006 : Daft Punk - The Prime Time Of Your Life
 2006 : MSTRKRFT - Work On You
 2006 : Trabant - The One
 2006 : Vegastar - Elle Blesse
 2007 : Teki Latex - Disco Dance With You
 2007 : Datarock - I Used To Dance With My Daddy
 2007 : Boys Noize - My Head
 2007 : Plaid - Kiddie Castle
 2008 : Ayumi Hamasaki - Greatful Days
 2008 : Guns 'n' Bombs - Riddle Of Steel
 2009 : Tahiti Boy and the Palmtree Family - 1973
 2009 : Boys Noize - Jeffer
 2009 : Beethoven - 7e Symphonie : Allegretto
 2009 : J.S. Bach - Ouverture de la Passion selon St Jean
 2009 : W.A. Mozart - Offertoire du Requiem K626
 2010 : Bart B More - Romane
 2010 : Bot'Ox - Blue Steel (with Tacteel)
 2010 : Depressed Buttons - Ow
 2010 : Canblaster - Clockworks (avec Teki Latex)
 2011 : Drop The Lime - Hot As Hell
 2011 : Arnaud Fleurent-Didier - France Culture
 2011 : Hey Today! - Minor
 2011 : Jupiter - Saké (avec Tacteel)
 2011 : Shake Aletti - Work (with Tacteel)
 2011 : Noob - Powder (with Teki Latex)
 2011 : Justice - Audio Video Disco
 2012 : Surkin - Silver Island
 2013 :  - Cardiocleptomania
 2015 : Dua Lipa - "New Love"

Sources

External links 
 "It Was On Earth That I Knew Joy" Official trailer

French record producers
Living people
1979 births
Because Music artists